Teng Tsu-lin is a politician in the Republic of China. He was the Minister of Veterans Affairs Commission of the Executive Yuan in 2003–2004.

See also
 Veterans Affairs Commission

References

Living people
Taiwanese Ministers of the Veterans Affairs Council
Year of birth missing (living people)